Skipanes is a village on the Faeroese island of Eysturoy in Runavík Municipality. Founded in 1841, the population as of August 2022 was 55 people. In amalgamation with undir Gøtueiði in Eysturkommuna, it forms a tiny conurbation; a small creek acts as a border between the two settlements. Notable residents of Skipanes include Terji Skibenæs, the guitarist of the Faeroese Viking Metal group Týr.

Its postal code is FO-665.

See also

 List of towns in the Faroe Islands

References

External links
 Danish site with photographs of Skipanes

Populated places in the Faroe Islands